Tsamarella is a traditional food and one of Cyprus' main lunch meats which is common in both Greek Cypriot and Turkish Cypriot communities.

Preparation
It consists usually of goat's meat (the whole animal without its bones) that is salted and cured for preservation. The process of preparation traditionally involves drying in the sun for few days. After that, the meat was placed in boiled water and it was filled with condiment (usually oregano) and then producers put it again in the sun for one more day. Tsamarella is soft, it has salty taste and it is served with alcoholic beverages (wine, zivania etc.) as a meze.

Historical facts
Like the vast majority of Cyprus' dried meats (lountza, loukaniko, apohtin, zalatina etc.), tsamarella is a traditional product of Marathasa Valley, Pitsilia 
and Pafos' agricultural areas. Moreover, in the past it was placed in special wooden lockers and it was used as a way to maintain food.

See also

 Jerky
 List of dried foods
 List of goat dishes

References

External links
 Description from Cyprus tourist information site 

Dried meat
Cypriot cuisine
Goat dishes